Under the Sign of Saturn is Susan Sontag's third collection of criticism, comprising seven essays. The collection was originally published in 1980. All of the essays were originally published in The New York Review of Books except for "Approaching Artaud," which was originally published in The New Yorker.

Reception
David Bromwich of The New York Times wrote:

References

Further reading 

 
 
 
 
 
 

1980 non-fiction books
American essay collections
Books of literary criticism
English-language books
Works by Susan Sontag
Works originally published in The New York Review of Books